Little Lake is a lake located in Door County, Wisconsin. The lake is found on Washington Island in Green Bay of Lake Michigan. Most of the lake is shallow and has a bottom that is muck. Although the northwest corner of the lake is only  from Lake Michigan, the lake is spring fed. It is a recursive lake, due to it being a lake on an island. The shore around the lake is partially owned by the Door County Land Trust. This area is designated as a Wisconsin State Natural Area by the Wisconsin Department of Natural Resources.

There are seven lakes in Wisconsin that are named Little Lake.

See also
 List of lakes of Wisconsin § Door County

References

Lakes of Door County, Wisconsin